The Walled Obelisk or Masonry Obelisk is a Roman monument in the form of an obelisk in the former Hippodrome of Constantinople, now Sultanahmet Square in Istanbul, Turkey. It is situated west of the Sultan Ahmed Mosque, at the southern end of the ancient chariot-racing track of Constantinople's central barrier, beside the Obelisk of Theodosius and the Serpentine Column. Its original construction date in late antiquity is unknown, but it is sometimes named Constantine's Obelisk after the inscription added by the Roman emperor Constantine VII Porphyrogenitus, who repaired it in the 10th century.

History 

The -high The obelisk was most likely a Theodosian construction, built to mirror the Obelisk of Theodosius on the spina of the Roman circus of Constantinople; the Circus Maximus in Rome also had two obelisks on its spina. 

The 10th-century emperor Constantine VII had the monument restored and coated with plates of gilt bronze; a Greek inscription in iambic trimeter was added at this time. The inscription mentions the repair works carried out by Constantine VII and compares it to the colossus in Rhodes. In addition to this the inscription also mentions the name of his son and successor, Romanos II.

By the 10th and 11th centuries, the obelisk was referred to as the 'tower of brass' in the medieval Arab world, although accounts sometimes confused it with the Obelisk of Theodosius. The late 12th-early 13th-century writer al-Harawi was the source for several Arabic geographers' inclusion of a detail about the monument: the Byzantines put potsherds and nuts amongst the masonry in order to see them crack when strong winds would cause the stones to shift.

At that time, it was decorated with gilded bronze plaques that portrayed the victories of Basil I, the grandfather of Constantine VII.

The obelisk's gilded bronze plaques were removed and melted down by the Fourth Crusaders in 1204.

Since young Janissaries liked to show their prowess by climbing the obelisk, the masonry suffered further damage to its surface.

The Walled Obelisk was depicted on the reverse of the Turkish 500 lira banknotes of 1953–1976.

Inscription 
The inscription in iambic trimeters commemorating the Obelisk's restoration by Constantine VII is as follows:

References

Bibliography

External links

Ancient obelisks
Hippodrome of Constantinople
Obelisks in Istanbul